Isotoma tridens is a small herbaceous plant in the family Campanulaceae native to Victoria.

References

tridens
Flora of Victoria (Australia)